Brandt's cormorant (Urile penicillatus) is a strictly marine bird of the cormorant family of seabirds that inhabits the Pacific coast of North America. It ranges, in the summer, from Alaska to the Gulf of California, but the population north of Vancouver Island migrates south during the winter. Its specific name, penicillatus is Latin for a painter's brush (pencil of hairs), in reference to white plumes on its neck and back during the early breeding season. The common name honors the German naturalist Johann Friedrich von Brandt of the Academy of Sciences at St. Petersburg, who described the species from specimens collected on expeditions to the Pacific during the early 19th century.

Taxonomy
It was formerly classified in the genus Phalacrocorax, but a 2014 study supported reclassifying it and several other Pacific cormorant species into the genus Urile. The IOC followed this classification in 2021.

Description
The average size of a Brandt's cormorant is 4.6 pounds. They have a length of about 34 inches and their wingspan is 4 feet. During the breeding season, adults have a blue throat patch.

Distribution and habitat
Brandt's cormorants live on the Pacific coast of North America, in habitats such as bays, estuaries, and lagoons. This species nests on the ground or on rocky outcroppings. Año Nuevo Island is an important seabird breeding colony in the Monterey Bay National Marine Sanctuary, hosting Brandt’s cormorants among other species of seabirds.

Behavior

They typically live in groups. They breed between March and August, and usually have four eggs. Young birds are cared for by both parents.

Diet
Brandt's cormorants mostly eat fish such as herring and rockfish, but their diet can include other fish as well as shrimp and crabs. To hunt, they dive beneath the surface of the ocean to catch fish. They can dive over 200 feet deep. They can hunt either in groups or alone.

Brandt's cormorants feed either singly or in flocks, and are adaptable in prey choice and undersea habitat. It feeds on small fish from the surface to sea floor, obtaining them, like all cormorants, by pursuit diving using its feet for propulsion. Prey is often what is most common: in central California, rockfish from the genus Sebastes is the most commonly taken, but off British Columbia, it is Pacific herring.

References

Brandt's cormorant
Native birds of Western Canada
Native birds of the West Coast of the United States
Birds of Mexico
Fauna of the San Francisco Bay Area
Brandt's cormorant
Brandt's cormorant